Euctenospila is a genus of moths of the family Crambidae. It contains only one species, Euctenospila castalis, which is found in the Democratic Republic of Congo (West Kasai) and Ethiopia.

References

Odontiinae
Crambidae genera
Taxa named by William Warren (entomologist)